Orior Upper (from , the name of an ancient Gaelic territory) is a barony in County Armagh, Northern Ireland. It lies in the south-east of the county and borders the Republic of Ireland with its southern boundary. It is bordered by five other baronies in Northern Ireland: Fews Upper and an enclave of Fews Lower to the west; Orior Lower to the north; Iveagh Upper, Upper Half to its west, which is divided in two by the Lordship of Newry. It also borders two baronies in the Republic of Ireland: Dundalk Lower and Dundalk Upper to the south.

List of settlements
Below is a list of settlements in Orior Upper:

Villages
Belleek
Camlough

Population centres
Forkhill (also part in the barony of Orior Lower)
Jerrettspass (also part in the barony of Orior Lower)
Jonesborough
Kingsmills
Loughgilly (also part in the baronies of Fews Lower and Orior Lower)

List of civil parishes
Below is a list of civil parishes in Orior Upper:
Forkhill
Jonesborough
Killevy (split with the barony of Orior Lower)
Loughgilly (split with the baronies of Fews Lower and Orior Lower)
Newry (also partly in baronies of Lordship of Newry, Oneilland West and Iveagh Upper, Lower Half)

References